The 2003 Mid Sussex District Council election took place on 1 May 2003 to elect members of Mid Sussex District Council in England. It was held on the same day as other local elections. The Conservatives won a majority of one on the council.

Council composition 

After the election, the composition of the council was:

Results summary

Ward results

Ardingly and Balcombe

Ashurst Wood

Bolney

Burgess Hill Dunstall

Burgess Hill Franklands

Burgess Hill Leylands

Burgess Hill Meeds

Burgess Hill St Andrews

Burgess Hill Victoria

Copthorne and Worth

Crawley Down and Turners Hill

Cuckfield

East Grinstead Ashplats

East Grinstead Baldwins

East Grinstead Herontye

Second seat decided on drawing of lots due to second and third place getting the same number of votes. Ian Dixon, the Liberal Democrat won therefore Edward Belsey was not elected.

East Grinstead Imberhorne

East Grinstead Town

Hassocks

Haywards Heath Ashenground

Haywards Heath Bentswood

Haywards Heath Franklands

Haywards Heath Heath

Haywards Heath Lucastes

High Weald

Hurstpierpoint and Downs

Lindfield

References

2003 English local elections
May 2003 events in the United Kingdom
2003
2000s in West Sussex